Crocanthes cyclopsana is a moth in the family Lecithoceridae. It was described by Kyu-Tek Park in 2011. It is found in Papua New Guinea.

The forewings are orange white, with a distinct 8-shaped postmedian fascia. The hindwings have an orange-white zigzag line between the submarginal and marginal fascia.

Etymology
The species name is derived from the type locality, the Cyclops Mountains.

References

Moths described in 2011
Crocanthes